Fight or Flight, is the fifth studio album by American rock band Hoobastank released on September 11, 2012, delayed from prior July 31, 2012 and  August 28, 2012 dates. Like their previous album, the album deals with relationships and love themes and it follows a more mainstream sound.

Overview
Produced by Gavin Brown, the album features eleven new studio tracks including first single, "This Is Gonna Hurt." On May 3, 2012 the band revealed the first single on their official website. The release of Fight or Flight marks the band's newfound independence and the opportunity to move forward on their own terms. "We've been on this journey for a long time now," says singer Doug Robb. "It's like a clean slate, but not in a bad way—quite the opposite. We're no longer trying to satisfy others, not even on a subconscious level; we're comfortable in our own skin." On July 11, 2012 a tentative cover artwork was revealed in Hoobastank's Facebook page, but on July 19, 2012 it was changed for the definitive cover artwork.

Track listing
All songs written by Douglas Robb, Daniel Estrin, Chris Hesse, Jesse Charland.

Personnel
Hoobastank
Doug Robb - lead vocals, rhythm guitar
Daniel Estrin - lead guitar, ukulele
Chris Hesse - drums, percussion
Jesse Charland - bass, backing vocals, keyboards

'''Production
Steve Wood, Paul Geary - management
Gavin Brown - producer
Paul David Hager - mixing

Charts

References

2012 albums
Hoobastank albums
Albums produced by Gavin Brown (musician)